() means "Head of the year" in Arabic and refers to the beginning of a new year. 

The term has a common origin with the Hebrew "Rosh Hashanah" (also meaning "Head of the year"), reflecting the common heritage of the Jews and Arabs.
 
Islamic culture
New Year celebrations